Wivenhoe is a town and civil parish in north-eastern Essex, England, approximately  south-east of Colchester. Historically Wivenhoe village, on the banks of the River Colne, and Wivenhoe Cross, on the higher ground to the north, were two separate settlements; however, with considerable development in the 19th century, the two have since merged.

At the 2011 census, the town had a population of 7,637, compared with 7,221 in 2001.

The town's history centres on fishing, ship building and smuggling.

Much of lower Wivenhoe is also a designated conservation area, with many streets being of particular architectural interest.

Etymology
The place-name Wivenhoe is Saxon in origin, deriving from the personal name Wifa's or Wife's spur or promontory (hoe). The place-name is now usually pronounced 'Wivvenho', but the Essex accent would traditionally have rendered it as 'Wivvenhoo'. According to folk etymology, the name derived from "Wyvernhoe", originating from the mythical beast called a wyvern and the previously mentioned ridge (hoe). The town's football team, Wivenhoe Town FC, is nicknamed 'The Wyverns'.

History 

Wivenhoe is recorded in the Domesday Book of 1086 as Wiivnhou in the hundred of Lexden, when it formed part of the land of Robert Gernon, where there was a mill,  of meadow and pasture for 60 sheep. 
The church of St. Mary the Virgin is in the High Street and existed by 1254 when Simon Battle was the patron. The North and South aisles were built in 1340 and 1350, making it the oldest building still standing in Wivenhoe. It has a chancel with north and south chapels and a north vestry, an aisled and clerestoried nave with north and south porches, and a west tower on which there is an open-sided cupola added to the roof by 1734. The walls are of rubble, which includes some Roman tile, with ashlar dressings. Elizabeth de Vere (d. 1537), widow of John, 13th earl of Oxford, left Wivenhoe church the vestments and ornaments from her private chapel. The tower was plastered in 1563.

Wivenhoe developed as a port and until the late 19th century was effectively a port for Colchester, as large ships were unable to navigate any further up the River Colne, which widens here into its estuary. Wivenhoe had two prosperous shipyards. It became an important port for trade for Colchester and developed shipbuilding, commerce and fishing industries. The period of greatest prosperity for the town came with the arrival of the railway in 1863.

In 1884 the town suffered significant damage when it lay close to the epicentre of one of the most destructive UK earthquakes of all time – the 1884 Colchester earthquake. In 1890, there was a population of about 2,000 mostly engaged in fishing for oysters and sprats and in ship and yacht building. A dry dock was built in 1889 and extended in 1904, making it one of the largest on the East Coast; it was demolished in the mid-1960s. In the 1960s, Wivenhoe Park was chosen as the location for the University of Essex.

During the UK miners' strike, the now defunct Wivenhoe Port imported coal and became subject to picketing by miners (many from Yorkshire), which led to a very substantial police presence, some of them drafted in from other counties, and violent skirmishes as striking miners tried to prevent vehicles entering and leaving the port.

Wivenhoe Park

Wivenhoe Park, bordering on the town of Colchester, is the location for the University of Essex.  The site was the home for several centuries of the Rebow family, descendants of Flemish clothweavers from Colchester. Wivenhoe House was designed for Isaac Martin Rebow in 1759 by Thomas Reynolds; the park itself was designed by Richard Woods. it was remodelled in 1846-7 by T. Hopper. A view of the house across the lake was painted by John Constable on a social visit to Major-General Francis Slater Rebow in 1816 for a fee of 100 guineas.

Transport

Wivenhoe railway station is situated on the Sunshine Coast Line, a branch off the Great Eastern Main Line, which links Colchester with the seaside resorts of Clacton-on-Sea and Walton-on-the-Naze. Direct electric services, operated by Abellio Greater Anglia, run from Wivenhoe station to Clacton-on-Sea, Walton-on-the-Naze, Colchester and London Liverpool Street. The station was the junction for the now defunct line to Brightlingsea (1866-1964).

The town is connected by a seasonal foot ferry service, which runs on weekends and bank holidays according to the tide from April to mid-October, across the river Colne to Fingringhoe and Rowhedge. A boat service also runs during the Summer with dates determined by tide, from Brightlingsea. Connecting water links for this service are also available from St. Osyth and East Mersea.

Local bus services are operated by First Essex and Hedingham & Chambers. 
Routes serving Wivenhoe include the 74 from Colchester to Clacton.

Wivenhoe is located just over one hour away from Stansted Airport and 30 minutes from Harwich International Port.

Society and leisure

Wivenhoe has a population of between nine and ten thousand people with a mixture of students from the University of Essex, a long-standing artistic community, and commuters. Property prices averaged £286,000 in February 2008. The town has a number of small local shops: there is a bookshop which was established in 1976, (shortlisted for the national Independent Bookseller of the Year award 2008) a chemist, two post offices, corner house coffee shop, toy shop, delicatessen, tea rooms, Co-op, pet supplier, florist and art gallery. There are five pubs including the Black Buoy Pub, Horse and Groom, The Greyhound, The Station, and the Rose and Crown. Some of which are the venue for musical events, including a jazz club. The Crab & Winkle Gallery can be found at the town's railway station. The town is popular with students from the university who walk from the campus to enjoy the facilities of the town's public houses and its waterfront.

The town has a number of sports and leisure clubs and societies: Wivenhoe Sailing Club's clubhouse is just downstream of the river barrier. Wivenhoe Town Football Club play at Broad Lane Sports Ground, which is also used by Colchester United Ladies and was home to Wivenhoe Old Boys Football Club, and is also home to Wivenhoe Tennis Club. Wivenhoe Town Cricket Club is located on Rectory Road. There are a number of musical and theatre groups, and an art gallery. The King George V Playing Field is in the lower half of the town, with a small skate park, football pitches, a small play park and a dog-walking area. There is a bowls club on De Vere Lane and a bridge club meets in the Town Council's offices.

Education
Wivenhoe has two primary schools: Broomgrove Infant and Junior, and Millfields Primary.

Secondary schools are available in the surrounding area. The University of Essex has been located at Wivenhoe Park since 1964.

Notable residents
Wivenhoe manor was owned by John de Vere, 12th Earl of Oxford and was passed down with the earldom until sold by Edward de Vere, 17th Earl of Oxford in 1584. The actor-manager Sir John Martin-Harvey was born in the village in 1863 (died 1944) and is commemorated by a blue plaque on Quay House, one of his childhood homes. He was the son of yacht-designer John Harvey and grandson of Thomas Harvey, yacht builder. The Volante was built by Thomas Harvey & Son (Thomas & Thomas Harvey junior) in the Halifax Yard at Ipswich. The "Volante" competed in the first America's Cup in 1851.

Harry Bensley, who became famous for taking on a wager to walk around Britain and eighteen other countries while wearing an iron mask and pushing a perambulator, lived in the village with his wife Kate after having served in the First World War, whilst pianist and popular entertainer Semprini (1908–1990) lived in Talisman House, adjacent to the high street in Wivenhoe, during his retirement.

Wivenhoe was also the home of actress Joan Hickson (1906–1998) who played Miss Marple in the BBC adaptations of Agatha Christie's novels and children's author, journalist, and writer Leila Berg (1917–2012). Berg was an advocate for the empowerment of children, particularly through literature, which prompted her to devise and launch the 'Nippers' series of early readers books published by Macmillan in 1968, which sought to address the exclusion of working-class and ethnic minority lives from children's books.

British academic Anthony Everitt (b. 1940) who publishes regularly in The Guardian and The Financial Times also lives in Wivenhoe. Everitt was Secretary-General of the Arts Council of Great Britain and is author of Cicero: The Life and Times of Rome's Greatest Politician. He is a visiting professor in the performing and visual arts at Nottingham Trent University, a companion of the Liverpool Institute of Performing Arts and an Honorary Fellow of the Dartington College of Arts. Other residents include the poet and musician Martin Newell, writer A. L. Kennedy, James Dodds, painter, printmaker and publisher under the imprint of Jardine Press, who has been described as "boatbuilding's artist laureate", and the singer Polly Scattergood, who was born in Wivenhoe before moving to London.

Wivenhoe was once a favourite watering-hole of the painter Francis Bacon, who owned a house on Queens Road (no. 68) which he purchased for £6,500 so he could spend time out of London visiting his friends, the artists Dickie Chopping (1917–2008) and Denis Wirth-Miller (1915–2011). The house remained as it was for many years after his death in 1992. Several journalists and writers have also been based in the lower end of the town: George Gale (former editor of The Spectator, Daily Telegraph cartoonist and Daily Express columnist) parodied by Private Eye magazine as 'George G. Ale', and Peregrine Worsthorne, (former editor of the Sunday Telegraph) who both had homes there. Poet and political activist Anna Mendelson (as 'Grace Lake') was a resident of Wivenhoe and associated with the short-lived British terrorist organisation the Angry Brigade whilst a student at Essex University.

The musician Keith Christmas was born in Wivenhoe in 1946 and lived there until 1961, in a house at the top of the High Street called Myrtle Villa.

References

Sources

External links 

 Wivenhoe Town Council
 BBC Inside Out Miners' Strike

 
Towns in Essex
Civil parishes in Essex
Borough of Colchester